USS Zizania was a patrol craft tender that served in the United States Navy from 1917 to 1919 and again as USS Adario from 1943 to 1946.

Zizania was built in 1888 at Baltimore, Maryland, as a lighthouse tender for the United States Lighthouse Service.

Service history

1917-1925

Zizania was transferred to the U.S. Department of War by an executive order dated 24 April 1917. Subsequently reassigned to the US Navy, Zizania served during World War I as a tender to section patrol craft operating in the 1st Naval District.

When control over the United States Lighthouse Service reverted on 1 July 1919 to the US Department of Commerce, Zizania was struck from the Navy List. Based at Portland, Maine, she resumed duty tending lighthouses along the New England coast and remained so employed until 1925, when her name was dropped from the list of United States Lighthouse Service vessels.

Little is known concerning Zizania's fate from 1925 to 1938. By the latter year, she was owned by Mr. John F. Burke and operated out of Boston, Mass.

1943-1946
The Navy reacquired her through the Maritime Commission on 9 August 1943 at which time she was placed in service at Norfolk, Va. On 26 August, she was renamed Adario and designated YNT-25. She spent the remainder of World War II operating at Norfolk under the control of the Commandant, 5th Naval District. During her term of service, Adario probably performed more tug duties than net tender chores for, on 4 August 1945, she was redesignated a medium tug, YTM-743.

She was placed out of service on 17 April 1946, and her name was struck from the Navy list on 1 May 1946. She was transferred to the Maritime Commission's War Shipping Administration on 21 January 1947 for final disposition.

References

Ships built in Baltimore
1888 ships
World War I auxiliary ships of the United States
Patrol craft tenders of the United States Navy
Ships of the United States Lighthouse Service
World War II auxiliary ships of the United States
Tugboats of the United States
Lighthouse tenders of the United States